Cook County Board of Commissioners 16th district is a electoral district for the Cook County Board of Commissioners.

The district was established in 1994, when the board transitioned from holding elections in individual districts, as opposed to the previous practice of holding a set of two at-large elections (one for ten seats from the city of Chicago and another for seven seats from suburban Cook County).

Geography

1994 boundaries
When the district was first established, it covered part of the western suburbs of Cook County and a small portion of Chicago.

The district was bizarrely shaped. It stretched from Wheeling Township (about ten miles north of O'Hare International Airport) to the county line with Will County, the two points being 42 miles apart. For much of its length, the district was only one-mile wide. At some points it was narrower. The small portion of Chicago in the district contained O'Hare International Airport.

2001 redistricting
New boundaries were adopted in August 2001, with redistricting taking place following the 2000 United States Census.

In regards to townships, the district's redistricted boundaries included portions of Berwyn, Cicero, Leyden, Lyons, Proviso, Stickney townships.

2012 redistricting
The district, as redistricted in 2012 following the 2010 United States Census, included parts of Beford Park, Bellwood, Berkely, Berwyn, Bridgeview, Broadview, Brookfield, Chicago, Cicero, Countryside, Forest View, Franklin Park, Hodgkins, Hillside, Justice, La Grange, La Grange Park, Lyons, Maywood, McCook, Melrose Park, North Riverside, Stickney, Northlake, Riverside, Stone Park, Summit, and Westchester.

In regards to townships and equivalent jurisdictions, it included portions of the city of Chicago, as well as portions of Berwyn, Cicero, Leyden, Lyons, Proviso, Riverside, Stickney townships.

The district was 46.77 square miles (29,932.44 acres).

Politics

List of commissioners representing the district

Election results

|-
| colspan=16 style="text-align:center;" |Cook County Board of Commissioners 16th district general elections
|-
!Year
!Winning candidate
!Party
!Vote (pct)
!Opponent
!Party
! Vote (pct)
!Opponent
!Party
! Vote (pct)
|-
|1994
| |Allan C. Carr
| | Republican
| | 
| | Tony Peraica
| | Democratic
| | 
|
|
|
|-
|1998
| |Allan C. Carr
| | Republican
| | 53,453 (100%)
|
|
|
|
|
|
|-
|2002
| |Tony Peraica
| | Republican
| |38,858 (53.14%)
| | Ronald M. Serpico, Sr.
| | Democratic
| | 34,262 (46.86%)
| 
| 
| 
|-
|2006
| |Tony Peraica
| | Republican
| |35,605 (51.04%)
| | William Edward Gomolinski
| | Democratic
| | 34,154 (48.96%)
| 
| 
| 
|-
|2010
| |Jeff Tobolski
| | Democratic
| |34,298 (50.67%)
| | Tony Peraica
| | Republican
| | 28,661 (42.34%)
| | Alejandro Reyes
| | Green
| | 4,735 (6.99%)
|-
|2014
| |Jeff Tobolski
| | Democratic
| |34,910 (100%)
| 
| 
| 
| 
| 
| 
|-
|2018
| |Jeff Tobolski
| | Democratic
| |54,322 (100%)
| 
| 
| 
| 
| 
| 
|-
|2022
| |Frank J. Aguilar
| | Democratic
| |38,100 (67.75%)
| | Kimberly Jagielski
| | Republican
| | 18,138 (32.25%)
|
|
|

References

Cook County Board of Commissioners districts
Constituencies established in 1994
1994 establishments in Illinois